Debby Carlson (born April 5, 1957) is a former Liberal MLA in Alberta, who represented the electoral district of Edmonton Ellerslie from 1993 to 2004.

Carlson won her seat in southeast Edmonton's Ellerslie area, and held it in the 1993, 1997, and 2001 elections until 2004 when she won a highly contested federal Liberal Party nomination in the Edmonton Strathcona riding. In 2004, Carlson was unsuccessful in her campaign against Conservative incumbent Rahim Jaffer, where she placed second. She was Deputy Leader of the Opposition and was once a star player in the Alberta Liberal Party, but then took a position as environmental critic.

She is married to Mike Percy, the former Liberal MLA for Edmonton-Whitemud (1993–1997), and Dean of the Alberta School of Business at the University of Alberta.

References

External links
Official site

Living people
Alberta Liberal Party MLAs
Women MLAs in Alberta
Canadian people of Swedish descent
Candidates in the 2004 Canadian federal election
Athabasca University alumni
21st-century Canadian women politicians
Liberal Party of Canada candidates for the Canadian House of Commons
1957 births